Edward Donaghy, known as Eddy Donaghy or Ted Donaghy (born 8 January 1900) was an English association football player and coach.

Career

Playing career
Born in Grangetown, Donaghy played for local club Grangetown St Mary's before playing with Football League teams Middlesbrough, Bradford City, Derby County and Gillingham.

Donaghy, a left half, made a total of 13 appearances in the Football League for Bradford City between May 1923 and May 1926.

He left Gillingham in 1928 to play in France, where he played for Cannes alongside fellow Englishman Stan Hillier.

Coaching career
Donaghy coached Dutch side Feyenoord between 1931 and 1935, winning two league titles.

Personal life
Eddy studied in St Mary's College. His brothers John and Peter were also professional players.

References

1900 births
Year of death missing
People from the City of Sunderland
Footballers from Tyne and Wear
English footballers
English expatriate footballers
English football managers
Middlesbrough F.C. players
Derby County F.C. players
Bradford City A.F.C. players
Gillingham F.C. players
AS Cannes players
English Football League players
Feyenoord managers
Association football wing halves
English expatriate sportspeople in the Netherlands
English expatriate sportspeople in France
Expatriate footballers in France
English expatriate football managers